The 2014 National Premier Leagues was the second season of the Australian National Premier Leagues football competition.

This season was notable for the fact that it expanded the league to include three new divisions: Northern NSW, Victoria and Western Australia. These new divisions, combined with the divisions of prior years (being ACT, NSW, Queensland, South Australia and Tasmania), totalled to eight divisional leagues that Australian players then competed in. The winners of each divisional league went on to compete in a finals playoff tournament at the end of the season. This culminated in a grand final in which North Eastern MetroStars were crowned as National Premier Leagues Champions, and were thus qualified for the 2015 FFA Cup Round of 32.

League tables

ACT

Finals

NSW

Finals

Northern NSW

Finals

Queensland

Finals

South Australia

Finals

Tasmania

Finals

The top 4 teams play a knock-out finals series called the Victory Cup, where the semi-final match-ups were randomly drawn.

Victoria

Western Australia

Finals

Results

ACT

NSW

Northern NSW

Queensland

South Australia

Tasmania

Victoria

Western Australia

Final Series
The winner of each league competition (top of the table) in the NPL competed in a single match knockout tournament to decide the National Premier Leagues Champion for 2014. The participants were matched up based on geographical proximity. Home advantage for the semi-finals and final was based on a formula relating to time of winning (normal time, extra time or penalties), goals scored and allowed, and yellow/red cards. North Eastern MetroStars won the grand final, and also qualified for the 2015 FFA Cup Round of 32.

Quarter-finals

Semi-finals

Grand final

Individual honours
David Vranković from Bonnyrigg White Eagles won the John Kosmina Medal for the best player in the NPL grand final.

References

External links
 Official website

National Premier Leagues seasons
2014 domestic association football leagues
2014 in Australian soccer